Victoria Jurczok (born 25 March 1990) is a German sailor. She represented Germany, along with partner Anika Lorenz, in the women's 49er FX class at the 2016 Summer Olympics in Rio de Janeiro. They finished in 9th place.

References 

1990 births
Living people
German female sailors (sport)
Olympic sailors of Germany
Sailors at the 2016 Summer Olympics – 49er FX
49er FX class sailors